Southwest Islanders Village is a small village near Meyuns in Koror, Palau. It consists of a village and a jetty.

References 

Populated places in Palau